Montague Harbour Marine Provincial Park is a provincial park in British Columbia, Canada, located on Galiano Island, one of the Gulf Islands off BC's South Coast in Canada. It is accessible by BC Ferries from Swartz Bay on Vancouver Island or Tsawwassen on the Mainland.

It is a very popular anchorage in the summer months and mooring buoys are provided by the park for visiting boats. It is also a popular spot for kayakers to stop for a night. The park has great camping with sites overlooking the water, picnic tables and pit toilets. It is on a peninsula with beaches and rock pools to play in and explore. There is a small marina within walking distance from the park which stocks basic supplies.

References

BC Parks webpage

Provincial parks of British Columbia
Galiano Island
1959 establishments in British Columbia
Protected areas established in 1959
Marine parks of Canada